Baj is a village in Komárom-Esztergom county, Hungary.

References

External links 
 Spherical panorama from Baj town
 Street map (Hungarian)

Populated places in Komárom-Esztergom County
Hungarian German communities